The 1992 Miami Redskins football team was an American football team that represented Miami University in the Mid-American Conference (MAC) during the 1992 NCAA Division I-A football season. In its third season under head coach Randy Walker, the team compiled a 6–4–1 record (5–3 against MAC opponents), finished in a tie for third place in the MAC, and outscored all opponents by a combined total of 210 to 204.

The team's statistical leaders included Neil Dougherty with 1,486 passing yards, Deland McCullough with 1,026 rushing yards, and Jeremy Patterson with 370 receiving yards.

Schedule

References

Miami
Miami RedHawks football seasons
Miami Redskins football